United Nations Security Council resolution 1060, adopted unanimously on 12 June 1996, after reaffirming resolutions 687 (1991), 707 (1991) and 715 (1991) on the monitoring of Iraq's weapons programme, the Council demanded that Iraq co-operate with weapons inspection teams from the United Nations Special Commission and allow unrestricted access to any areas and equipment the teams requested.

The Security Council took note of the progress of the Special Committee in the elimination of Iraq's programs of weapons of mass destruction and the remaining problems to be resolved. On 11 and 12 June 1996, Iraq denied an inspection team access to certain sites. Resolutions 687, 707 and 715 gave the weapons inspection teams unconditional and unrestricted access to any sites it wished to inspect, and any attempt by Iraq to obstruct that was considered unacceptable by the council.

Acting under Chapter VII of the United Nations Charter, the Council deplored Iraq's refusal to allow access to the sites by weapons inspection teams, in violation of previous Security Council resolutions. It demanded that the teams have access to sites, weapons, equipment and transport it requested and fully supported the work of the Special Commission in this matter.

See also
 Foreign relations of Iraq
 Gulf War
 Invasion of Kuwait
 Iraq and weapons of mass destruction
 Iraq disarmament timeline 1990–2003
 Iraq sanctions
 List of United Nations Security Council Resolutions 1001 to 1100 (1995–1997)

References

External links
 
Text of the Resolution at undocs.org

 1060
 1060
1996 in Iraq
Iraq and weapons of mass destruction
 1060
June 1996 events